Gustáv Mráz (born 11 September 1934) is a former Slovak football player. He played for the Czechoslovakia national team in 11 matches.

Club career
Mráz spent the majority of his career with Czechoslovak First League club Inter Bratislava, scoring twice in 106 league appearances. During the 1964–65 season, Mráz played for Sparta Prague.

References

External links
 

1934 births
Slovak footballers
Czechoslovak footballers
Footballers from Bratislava
1958 FIFA World Cup players
Czechoslovakia international footballers
FK Inter Bratislava players
AC Sparta Prague players
Living people

Association football midfielders